Morehouse is a city in New Madrid County, Missouri, United States. The population was 973 at the 2010 census.

History
Morehouse was established as a lumber camp in the 19th century.  It was known as "Little River" from 1877 to 1887. When a post office was established in 1893, it was named "Morehouse" after Albert P. Morehouse, who served as the 26th Governor of Missouri from 1887 to 1889.

Geography
Morehouse is located at  (36.845481, -89.691131). It lies along Missouri Route 114 west of Sikeston.  U.S. Route 60 passes along the city's southern boundary.

Demographics

2010 census
As of the census of 2010, there were 973 people, 426 households, and 268 families living in the city. The racial makeup of the city was 95.89% White, 0.82% Black or African American, 0.31% Native American, 0.10% Asian, 1.03% from other races, and 1.85% from two or more races. Hispanic or Latino of any race were 1.95% of the population.

There were 426 households, of which 27.2% had children under the age of 18 living with them, 41.5% were married couples living together, 13.1% had a female householder with no husband present, 8.2% had a male householder with no wife present, and 37.1% were non-families. 31.5% of all households were made up of individuals, and 14.6% had someone living alone who was 65 years of age or older. The average household size was 2.28 and the average family size was 2.82.

The median age in the city was 42.9 years. 21.5% of residents were under the age of 18; 6.6% were between the ages of 18 and 24; 24.9% were from 25 to 44; 30.1% were from 45 to 64; and 16.8% were 65 years of age or older. The gender makeup of the city was 48.6% male and 51.4% female.

2000 census
As of the census of 2000, there were 1,015 people, 428 households, and 294 families living in the city. The population density was 1,240.9 people per square mile (477.9/km). There were 492 housing units at an average density of 601.5 per square mile (231.7/km). The racial makeup of the city was 97.04% White, 0.49% African American, 0.30% Native American, 0.10% Asian, 0.69% from other races, and 1.38% from two or more races. Hispanic or Latino of any race were 2.56% of the population.

There were 428 households, out of which 26.9% had children under the age of 18 living with them, 53.3% were married couples living together, 9.8% had a female householder with no husband present, and 31.1% were non-families. 25.9% of all households were made up of individuals, and 15.0% had someone living alone who was 65 years of age or older. The average household size was 2.37 and the average family size was 2.80.

In the city the population was spread out, with 22.9% under the age of 18, 8.6% from 18 to 24, 27.4% from 25 to 44, 24.1% from 45 to 64, and 17.0% who were 65 years of age or older. The median age was 38 years. For every 100 females there were 88.0 males. For every 100 females age 18 and over, there were 86.9 males.

The median income for a household in the city was $24,931, and the median income for a family was $30,144. Males had a median income of $26,389 versus $17,941 for females. The per capita income for the city was $12,691. About 10.5% of families and 13.2% of the population were below the poverty line, including 9.0% of those under age 18 and 24.1% of those age 65 or over.

Education
The Morehouse Elementary School is part of the Sikeston school system.

Morehouse has a lending library, a branch of the New Madrid County Library.

Notable people
Kasey Rogers (1925-2006), actress
Curt Barrett (1906–1989), actor

References

External links

 Historic maps of Morehouse in the Sanborn Maps of Missouri Collection at the University of Missouri

Cities in New Madrid County, Missouri
Cities in Missouri